Giacomo Gualco (30 December 1936 – 6 November 2011) was an Italian politician who served as the President of Liguria from September 1990 to January 1992. He died on November 6, 2011, at the age of 75.

References

See also
 Giacomo Gualco in Italian Language

1936 births
2011 deaths
Presidents of Liguria
Christian Democracy (Italy) politicians
Christian Democratic Centre politicians
20th-century Italian politicians
Politics of Liguria
Deputies of Legislature XI of Italy
People from Serravalle Scrivia